Melissa Rossi (born 1965 in Dayton, Ohio) is an American author and journalist who writes about subjects such as American politics and international geopolitical situations. In addition to her books, Rossi's work has been published in Newsweek, MSNBC, George, Newsday, Esquire, the New York Observer and National Geographic Traveler, where she wrote a regular column.

Early life
Rossi grew up moving all around the United States. She has lived in Seattle, Washington, New York, Vermont, Florida, Iowa, and Ohio. After writing one of her well-known books about Courtney Love, she decided she wanted to travel the world. She visited most European countries and has also lived in Spain, Italy, the Netherlands, and Belgium.

Rossi grew up wanting to be an artist; however, she has no skills.

Books

 What Every American Should Know About the Middle East (2008)
 What Every American Should Know About Who's Really Running America and what you can do about it (2007)
 What Every American Should Know About Europe: The Hotspots, Hotshots, Political Muck Ups, Cross-Border Sniping and Cultural Chaos of our Transatlantic Cousins (2006)
 What Every American Should Know About Who's Really Running the World: The People, Corporations and Organizations that Control Our Future (2005)
 What Every American Should Know About the Rest of the World: Your Guide to Today's Hotspots, Hotshots and Incendiary Issues (2003)
 Courtney Love: Queen of Noise (1996)
 Freak like Me: Inside the Jim Rose Circus Sideshow (1995)

References

External links
 Rossi's column at The Huffington Post
 Rossi's What Every American Should Know series
 Rossi's Penguin Group profile
 Vagabonding Travel Writers Interview with Rossi
 2003 CNN Interview with Rossi
 1994 Newsweek article by Rossi

1965 births
Living people
American non-fiction writers
American women journalists
Writers from Dayton, Ohio
Journalists from Ohio
20th-century American journalists
20th-century American women